Esperanza Pizarro Pagalday (born 15 April 2001) is a Uruguayan footballer who plays as a forward for Spanish Primera Federación club Santa Teresa CD and the Uruguay women's national team.

Club career
Pizarro has played for Nacional in Uruguay.

International career
Pizarro represented Uruguay at the 2018 South American U-20 Women's Championship and the 2018 FIFA U-17 Women's World Cup. She made her senior debut on 4 March 2019 in a 0–6 friendly loss against France.

References

External links
Esperanza Pizarro at BDFútbol

2001 births
Living people
Footballers from Montevideo
Uruguayan women's footballers
Women's association football forwards
Club Nacional de Football players
Santa Teresa CD players
Uruguay women's international footballers
Uruguayan expatriate women's footballers
Uruguayan expatriate sportspeople in Spain
Expatriate women's footballers in Spain